The New York Times is a major daily newspaper based in New York City. 

New York Times may also refer to:
The New York Times Company, the media company that publishes the Times
"New York Times", a song by Cat Stevens from the album Back to Earth
New York Times, a 1993 album by Carsten Bohn
New York Times, a 2001 album by Adam Bomb

See also
The New York Times Magazine, a weekly newspaper supplement
New York Times Building (disambiguation)

The Times (disambiguation)